is a Japanese professional shogi player, ranked 9-dan. He is a former major title holder, having won the Ōi, Kisei, Kiō and Ōshō titles throughout his career.

Early life
Gōda was born on March 17, 1971, in Suginami, Tokyo. He learned how to play shogi from his father when he was three years old.

In December 1982, he entered the Japan Shogi Association's apprentice school at the rank of 6-kyū under guidance of shogi professional . He was promoted to the rank of apprentice professional 1-dan in May 1985, and obtained professional status and the rank of 4-dan in February 1990.

Shogi professional
Gōda's first appearance in a major title match came in May 1992 when he challenged Kōji Tanigawa for the 60th Kisei title. Although Goda lost the match 3 games to 1, he was at the time only the second 4-dan to be the challenger for a major title. Later in September of that same year, Gōda and Tanigawa met once again in the 33rd Ōi title match, with Gōda winning the match 4 games to 2 to become the first 4-dan to win a major title. In December 1992, Gōda met Tanigawa for the third time in the 61st Kisei title match, with Tanigawa winning by the score of 3 games to 0, with one game ending in impasse.

Gōda won his next major title in 1998, defeating Nobuyuki Yashiki 3 games to 0 to win the 69th Kisei title. He was unable to retain the title the following year, losing to  3 games to none. In 2001, he regained the Kisei title by narrowly defeating Yoshiharu Habu by 3 games to 2. However, the following year he was again unable to defend his title, losing to Yasumitsu Satō by the same score of 3 games to 2.

In 2011, Gōda won the 37th Kiō title by defeating Toshiaki Kubo 3 games to 1. He was unable to successfully defend his Kiō title the next year, losing to Akira Watanabe 3 games to 1.

In 2014, Gōda won the 64th Ōshō title by defeating  4 games to 3. At 44 years old, he became the oldest first-time winner of the Ōshō title. The following year, 23 years after winning his first major title, he completed his first successful major title defense by defeating  4 games to 2. However, in 2016, Gōda was defeated by  4 games to 2 and lost his Ōshō title.

On October 3, 2007, Gōda defeated  to become the 36th shogi professional to win 600 official games, and on October 17, 2015, he defeated Masayuki Toyoshima to become the 18th shogi professional to win 800 official games.

Promotion history
Gōda's promotion history  is as follows:
 6-kyū: 1982
 1-dan: 1985
 4-dan: April 1, 1990
 5-dan: October 1, 1992
 6-dan: November 20, 1995
 7-dan: April 1, 1998
 8-dan: April 1, 1999
 9-dan: August 6, 2001

Titles and other championships
Gōda has appeared in major title matches a total of eighteen times, and has won six major titles. In addition to major titles, Gōda has won seven other shogi championships during his career.

Major titles

Other championships

Note: Tournaments marked with an asterisk (*) are no longer held.

Awards and honors
Gōda has received a number of awards and honors throughout his career for his accomplishments both on an off the shogi board. These include awards given out annually by the JSA for performance in official games as well as other JSA awards for career accomplishments, and awards received from governmental organizations, etc. for contributions made to Japanese society.

Annual shogi awards
20th Annual Awards (April 1992March 1993): Best New Player, Distinguished Service Award
22nd Annual Awards (April 1994March 1995): Most Games Won, Most Games Played, Distinguished Service Award
23rd Annual Awards (April 1995March 1996): Distinguished Service Award
25th Annual Awards (April 1997March 1998): Best Winning Percentage, Most Games Won, Most Games Played, Fighting-spirit Award
26th Annual Awards (April 1998March 1999): Fighting-spirit Award
29th Annual Awards (April 2001March 2002): Distinguished Service Award
39th Annual Awards (April 2011March 2012): Fighting-spirit Award
41st Annual Awards (April 2013March 2014): Fighting-spirit Award
42nd Annual Awards (April 2014March 2015): Fighting-spirit Award

Other awards
2007: Shogi Honor Award (Awarded by the JSA in recognition of winning 600 official games as a professional)
2015:  25 Years Service Award (Awarded by the JSA in recognition of being an active professional for twenty-five years), Shogi Honor Fighting-spirit Award (Awarded by JSA in recognition of winning 800 official games as a professional)

Year-end shogi prize money and game fee ranking
Gōda has finished in the "Top 10" of the JSA's  eighteen times since 1993.

Notes

References

External links
ShogiHub: Professional Player Info · Goda, Masataka

1971 births
Japanese shogi players
Living people
Professional shogi players
Professional shogi players from Tokyo
Kisei (shogi)
Ōi (shogi)
Kiō
Ōshō
People from Suginami
Ginga